is a Toyota research and development facility in Susono, Shizuoka, Japan. The facility was established in November 1966.

Notably, the center contains an advanced driving simulation housed inside a  diameter dome with an actual car inside. The simulator is used to analyse driver behaviors in order to improve safety. Higashi-Fuji also includes a crash test building.

References

External links
 

Shizuoka Prefecture
Toyota